The men's Greco-Roman featherweight was a Greco-Roman wrestling event held as part of the Wrestling at the 1924 Summer Olympics programme. It was the third appearance of the event. Featherweight was the second-lightest category, including wrestlers weighing 58 to 62 kilograms.

Results
Source: Official results; Wudarski

The tournament was double-elimination.

First round

Second round

Third round

Fourth round

Fifth round

Sixth round

Seventh round

This round left only two undefeated wrestlers, who advanced to the eighth round.  Nord, with his second loss, finished fourth.  Malmberg, taking his first loss in the seventh round, finished with the bronze medal.

Eighth round

Anttila defeated Toivola for the gold medal.

References

Wrestling at the 1924 Summer Olympics